Locust Grove High School may refer to:

Locust Grove High School (Georgia), a public high school in Locust Grove, Georgia, United States
Locust Grove High School (Oklahoma), a public high school in Locust Grove, Oklahoma